A biome is a biogeographical unit consisting of a biological community that has formed in response to the physical environment in which they are found and a shared regional climate. Biomes may span more than one continent.  Biome is a broader term than habitat and can comprise a variety of habitats.

While a biome can cover large areas, a microbiome is a mix of organisms that coexist in a defined space on a much smaller scale. For example, the human microbiome is the collection of bacteria, viruses, and other microorganisms that are present on or in a human body.

A biota is the total collection of organisms of a geographic region or a time period, from local geographic scales and instantaneous temporal scales all the way up to whole-planet and whole-timescale spatiotemporal scales. The biotas of the Earth make up the biosphere.

Etymology 
The term was suggested in 1916 by Clements, originally as a synonym for biotic community of Möbius (1877). Later, it gained its current definition, based on earlier concepts of phytophysiognomy, formation and vegetation (used in opposition to flora), with the inclusion of the animal element and the exclusion of the taxonomic element of species composition. In 1935, Tansley added the climatic and soil aspects to the idea, calling it ecosystem. The International Biological Program (1964–74) projects popularized the concept of biome.

However, in some contexts, the term biome is used in a different manner. In German literature, particularly in the Walter terminology, the term is used similarly as biotope (a concrete geographical unit), while the biome definition used in this article is used as an international, non-regional, terminology—irrespectively of the continent in which an area is present, it takes the same biome name—and corresponds to his "zonobiome", "orobiome" and "pedobiome" (biomes determined by climate zone, altitude or soil).

In Brazilian literature, the term "biome" is sometimes used as synonym of biogeographic province, an area based on species composition (the term floristic province being used when plant species are considered), or also as synonym of the "morphoclimatic and phytogeographical domain" of Ab'Sáber, a geographic space with subcontinental dimensions, with the predominance of similar geomorphologic and climatic characteristics, and of a certain vegetation form. Both include many biomes in fact.

Classifications 
To divide the world into a few ecological zones is difficult, notably because of the small-scale variations that exist everywhere on earth and because of the gradual changeover from one biome to the other. Their boundaries must therefore be drawn arbitrarily and their characterization made according to the average conditions that predominate in them.

A 1978 study on North American grasslands found a positive logistic correlation between evapotranspiration in mm/yr and above-ground net primary production in g/m2/yr. The general results from the study were that precipitation and water use led to above-ground primary production, while solar irradiation and temperature lead to below-ground primary production (roots), and temperature and water lead to cool and warm season growth habit. These findings help explain the categories used in Holdridge's bioclassification scheme (see below), which were then later simplified by Whittaker. The number of classification schemes and the variety of determinants used in those schemes, however, should be taken as strong indicators that biomes do not fit perfectly into the classification schemes created.

Holdridge (1947, 1964) life zones 

In 1947, the American botanist and climatologist Leslie Holdridge classified climates based on the biological effects of temperature and rainfall on vegetation under the assumption that these two abiotic factors are the largest determinants of the types of vegetation found in a habitat. Holdridge uses the four axes to define 30 so-called "humidity provinces", which are clearly visible in his diagram. While this scheme largely ignores soil and sun exposure, Holdridge acknowledged that these were important.

Allee (1949) biome-types 
The principal biome-types by Allee (1949):
 Tundra
 Taiga
 Deciduous forest
 Grasslands
 Desert
 High plateaus
 Tropical forest
 Minor terrestrial biomes

Kendeigh (1961) biomes 
The principal biomes of the world by Kendeigh (1961):
 Terrestrial
 Temperate deciduous forest
 Coniferous forest
 Woodland
 Chaparral
 Tundra
 Grassland
 Desert
 Tropical savanna
 Tropical forest
 Marine
 Oceanic plankton and nekton
 Balanoid-gastropod-thallophyte
 Pelecypod-annelid
 Coral reef

Whittaker (1962, 1970, 1975) biome-types 

Whittaker classified biomes using two abiotic factors: precipitation and temperature. His scheme can be seen as a simplification of Holdridge's; more readily accessible, but missing Holdridge's greater specificity.

Whittaker based his approach on theoretical assertions and empirical sampling. He had previously compiled a review of biome classifications.

Key definitions for understanding Whittaker's scheme 
 Physiognomy: sometimes referring to the plants' appearance; or the biome's apparent characteristics, outward features, or appearance of ecological communities or species - including plants.
 Biome: a grouping of terrestrial ecosystems on a given continent that is similar in vegetation structure, physiognomy, features of the environment and characteristics of their animal communities.
 Formation: a major kind of community of plants on a given continent.
 Biome-type: grouping of convergent biomes or formations of different continents, defined by physiognomy.
 Formation-type: a grouping of convergent formations.

Whittaker's distinction between biome and formation can be simplified: formation is used when applied to plant communities only, while biome is used when concerned with both plants and animals. Whittaker's convention of biome-type or formation-type is a broader method to categorize similar communities.

Whittaker's parameters for classifying biome-types 
Whittaker used what he called "gradient analysis" of ecocline patterns to relate communities to climate on a worldwide scale. Whittaker considered four main ecoclines in the terrestrial realm.
 Intertidal levels: The wetness gradient of areas that are exposed to alternating water and dryness with intensities that vary by location from high to low tide
 Climatic moisture gradient
 Temperature gradient by altitude
 Temperature gradient by latitude

Along these gradients, Whittaker noted several trends that allowed him to qualitatively establish biome-types:
 The gradient runs from favorable to the extreme, with corresponding changes in productivity.
 Changes in physiognomic complexity vary with how favorable of an environment exists (decreasing community structure and reduction of stratal differentiation as the environment becomes less favorable).
 Trends in the diversity of structure follow trends in species diversity; alpha and beta species diversities decrease from favorable to extreme environments.
 Each growth-form (i.e. grasses, shrubs, etc.) has its characteristic place of maximum importance along the ecoclines.
 The same growth forms may be dominant in similar environments in widely different parts of the world.

Whittaker summed the effects of gradients (3) and (4) to get an overall temperature gradient and combined this with a gradient (2), the moisture gradient, to express the above conclusions in what is known as the Whittaker classification scheme. The scheme graphs average annual precipitation (x-axis) versus average annual temperature (y-axis) to classify biome-types.

Biome-types 

 Tropical rainforest
 Tropical seasonal rainforest
 deciduous
 semideciduous
 Temperate giant rainforest
 Montane rainforest
 Temperate deciduous forest
 Temperate evergreen forest
 needleleaf
 sclerophyll
 Subarctic-subalpine needle-leaved forests (taiga)
 Elfin woodland
 Thorn forests and woodlands
 Thorn scrub
 Temperate woodland
 Temperate shrublands
 deciduous
 heath
 sclerophyll
 subalpine-needleleaf
 subalpine-broadleaf
 Savanna
 Temperate grassland
 Alpine grasslands
 Tundra
 Tropical desert
 Warm-temperate desert
 Cool temperate desert scrub
 Arctic-alpine desert
 Bog
 Tropical fresh-water swamp forest
 Temperate fresh-water swamp forest
 Mangrove swamp
 Salt marsh
 Wetland

Goodall (1974–) ecosystem types 
The multi-authored series Ecosystems of the World, edited by David W. Goodall, provides a comprehensive coverage of the major "ecosystem types or biomes" on Earth:

Walter (1976, 2002) zonobiomes 
The eponymously named Heinrich Walter classification scheme considers the seasonality of temperature and precipitation. The system, also assessing precipitation and temperature, finds nine major biome types, with the important climate traits and vegetation types. The boundaries of each biome correlate to the conditions of moisture and cold stress that are strong determinants of plant form, and therefore the vegetation that defines the region. Extreme conditions, such as flooding in a swamp, can create different kinds of communities within the same biome.

Schultz (1988) eco-zones 
Schultz (1988, 2005) defined nine ecozones (his concept of ecozone is more similar to the concept of biome than to the concept of ecozone of BBC):

 polar/subpolar zone
 boreal zone
 humid mid-latitudes
 dry mid-latitudes
 subtropics with winter rain
 subtropics with year-round rain 
 dry tropics and subtropics
 tropics with summer rain
 tropics with year-round rain

Bailey (1989) ecoregions 
Robert G. Bailey nearly developed a biogeographical classification system of ecoregions for the United States in a map published in 1976. He subsequently expanded the system to include the rest of North America in 1981, and the world in 1989. The Bailey system, based on climate, is divided into four domains (polar, humid temperate, dry, and humid tropical), with further divisions based on other climate characteristics (subarctic, warm temperate, hot temperate, and subtropical; marine and continental; lowland and mountain).
 100 Polar Domain
 120 Tundra Division (Köppen: Ft)
 M120 Tundra Division – Mountain Provinces
 130 Subarctic Division (Köppen: E)
 M130 Subarctic Division – Mountain Provinces
 200 Humid Temperate Domain
 210 Warm Continental Division (Köppen: portion of Dcb)
 M210 Warm Continental Division – Mountain Provinces
 220 Hot Continental Division (Köppen: portion of Dca)
 M220 Hot Continental Division – Mountain Provinces
 230 Subtropical Division (Köppen: portion of Cf)
 M230 Subtropical Division – Mountain Provinces
 240 Marine Division (Köppen: Do)
 M240 Marine Division – Mountain Provinces
 250 Prairie Division (Köppen: arid portions of Cf, Dca, Dcb)
 260 Mediterranean Division (Köppen: Cs)
 M260 Mediterranean Division – Mountain Provinces
 300 Dry Domain
 310 Tropical/Subtropical Steppe Division
 M310 Tropical/Subtropical Steppe Division – Mountain Provinces
 320 Tropical/Subtropical Desert Division
 330 Temperate Steppe Division
 340 Temperate Desert Division
 400 Humid Tropical Domain
 410 Savanna Division
 420 Rainforest Division

Olson & Dinerstein (1998) biomes for WWF / Global 200 

A team of biologists convened by the World Wildlife Fund (WWF) developed a scheme that divided the world's land area into biogeographic realms (called "ecozones" in a BBC scheme), and these into ecoregions (Olson & Dinerstein, 1998, etc.). Each ecoregion is characterized by a main biome (also called major habitat type).

This classification is used to define the Global 200 list of ecoregions identified by the WWF as priorities for conservation.

For the terrestrial ecoregions, there is a specific EcoID, format XXnnNN (XX is the biogeographic realm, nn is the biome number, NN is the individual number).

Biogeographic realms (terrestrial and freshwater) 

 NA: Nearctic
 PA: Palearctic
 AT: Afrotropic
 IM: Indomalaya
 AA: Australasia
 NT: Neotropic
 OC: Oceania
 AN: Antarctic

The applicability of the realms scheme above - based on Udvardy (1975)—to most freshwater taxa is unresolved.

Biogeographic realms (marine) 

 Arctic
 Temperate Northern Atlantic
 Temperate Northern Pacific
 Tropical Atlantic
 Western Indo-Pacific
 Central Indo-Pacific
 Eastern Indo-Pacific
 Tropical Eastern Pacific
 Temperate South America
 Temperate Southern Africa
 Temperate Australasia
 Southern Ocean

Biomes (terrestrial) 
 Tropical and subtropical moist broadleaf forests (tropical and subtropical, humid)
 Tropical and subtropical dry broadleaf forests (tropical and subtropical, semihumid)
 Tropical and subtropical coniferous forests (tropical and subtropical, semihumid)
 Temperate broadleaf and mixed forests (temperate, humid)
 Temperate coniferous forests (temperate, humid to semihumid)
 Boreal forests/taiga (subarctic, humid)
 Tropical and subtropical grasslands, savannas, and shrublands (tropical and subtropical, semiarid)
 Temperate grasslands, savannas, and shrublands (temperate, semiarid)
 Flooded grasslands and savannas (temperate to tropical, fresh or brackish water inundated)
 Montane grasslands and shrublands (alpine or montane climate)
 Tundra (Arctic)
 Mediterranean forests, woodlands, and scrub or sclerophyll forests (temperate warm, semihumid to semiarid with winter rainfall)
 Deserts and xeric shrublands (temperate to tropical, arid)
 Mangrove (subtropical and tropical, salt water inundated)

Biomes (freshwater) 
According to the WWF, the following are classified as freshwater biomes:

 Large lakes
 Large river deltas
 Polar freshwaters
 Montane freshwaters
 Temperate coastal rivers
 Temperate floodplain rivers and wetlands
 Temperate upland rivers
 Tropical and subtropical coastal rivers
 Tropical and subtropical floodplain rivers and wetlands
 Tropical and subtropical upland rivers
 Xeric freshwaters and endorheic basins
 Oceanic islands

Biomes (marine) 
Biomes of the coastal and continental shelf areas (neritic zone):
 Polar
 Temperate shelves and sea
 Temperate upwelling
 Tropical upwelling
 Tropical coral

Summary of the scheme 
 Biosphere
 Biogeographic realms (terrestrial) (8)
 Ecoregions (867), each characterized by a main biome type (14)
 Ecosystems (biotopes)
 Biosphere
 Biogeographic realms (freshwater) (8)
 Ecoregions (426), each characterized by a main biome type (12)
 Ecosystems (biotopes)
 Biosphere
 Biogeographic realms (marine) (12)
 (Marine provinces) (62)
 Ecoregions (232), each characterized by a main biome type (5)
 Ecosystems (biotopes)

Example:
 Biosphere
 Biogeographic realm: Palearctic
 Ecoregion: Dinaric Mountains mixed forests (PA0418); biome type: temperate broadleaf and mixed forests
 Ecosystem: Orjen, vegetation belt between 1,100 and 1,450 m, Oromediterranean zone, nemoral zone (temperate zone)
 Biotope: Oreoherzogio-Abietetum illyricae Fuk. (Plant list)
 Plant: Silver fir (Abies alba)

Other biomes

Marine biomes 

Pruvot (1896) zones or "systems":
 Littoral zone
 Pelagic zone
 Abyssal zone

Longhurst (1998) biomes:
 Coastal
 Polar
 Trade wind
 Westerly

Other marine habitat types (not covered yet by the Global 200/WWF scheme):

 Open sea
 Deep sea
 Hydrothermal vents
 Cold seeps
 Benthic zone
 Pelagic zone (trades and westerlies)
 Abyssal
 Hadal (ocean trench)
 Littoral/Intertidal zone
 Salt marsh
 Estuaries
 Coastal lagoons/Atoll lagoons
 Kelp forest
 Pack ice

Anthropogenic biomes 

Humans have altered global patterns of biodiversity and ecosystem processes. As a result, vegetation forms predicted by conventional biome systems can no longer be observed across much of Earth's land surface as they have been replaced by crop and rangelands or cities. Anthropogenic biomes provide an alternative view of the terrestrial biosphere based on global patterns of sustained direct human interaction with ecosystems, including agriculture, human settlements, urbanization, forestry and other uses of land. Anthropogenic biomes offer a way to recognize the irreversible coupling of human and ecological systems at global scales and manage Earth's biosphere and anthropogenic biomes.

Major anthropogenic biomes:
 Dense settlements
 Croplands
 Rangelands
 Forested
 Indoor

Microbial biomes

Endolithic biomes 
The endolithic biome, consisting entirely of microscopic life in rock pores and cracks, kilometers beneath the surface, has only recently been discovered, and does not fit well into most classification schemes.

Effects of climate change 
Anthropogenic climate change has the potential to greatly alter the distribution of Earth's biomes. Meaning, biomes around the world could change so much that they would be at risk of becoming new biomes entirely. General frequency models have been a staple in finding out the impact climate change could have on biomes. More specifically, 54% and 22% of global land area will experience climates that correspond to other biomes. 3.6% of land area will experience climates that are completely new or unusual. Average temperatures have risen more than twice the usual amount in both arctic and mountainous biomes, which leads to the conclusion that arctic and mountainous biomes are currently the most vulnerable to climate change. The current reasoning surrounding as to why this is the case are based around the fact that colder environments tend to reflect more sunlight, as a result of the snow and ice covering the ground. Since the annual average temperatures are rising, ice and snow is melting. As a result, albedo is lowered. Keeping a keen eye on terrestrial biomes is important, as they play a crucial role in climate regulation. South American terrestrial biomes have been predicted to go through the same temperature trends as arctic and mountainous biomes. With its annual average temperature continuing to increase, the moisture currently located in forest biomes will dry up.

See also

References

Further reading 
 Ritter, Michael E. (2005). The Physical Environment: an Introduction to Physical Geography. University of Wisconsin-Stevens Point.

External links 

 University of California Museum of Paleontology Berkeley's The World's Biomes
 Gale/Cengage Biome Overview (archived 11 July 2011)
 
 Global Currents and Terrestrial Biomes Map
 WorldBiomes.com (archived 22 February 2011)
 Panda.org's Major Habitat Types (archived 6 July 2017)
 NASA's Earth Observatory Mission: Biomes
 World Map of Desert Biomes

 
Habitats